Hatice Şendil Şağyaşar (born 2 August 1983) is a Turkish actress and model. She has starred in many Turkish movies and series including Karadağlar, Dila Hanım, Kaderimin Yazıldığı Gün and Uyanış: Büyük Selçuklu.

Life and career 
Hatice Şendil was born on 2 August 1983 in Istanbul and was raised in Antalya. Her mother is from Istanbul and her father is from Antalya. She has two sisters. She majored in business.

In 2001, she competed in Miss Turkey and was placed third. As a result, she represented her country in Miss Europe beauty pageant and earned the fourth place. In 2001, she had a role in the music video for Çelik Erişçi's song "Töre". Meanwhile, she took acting and horse racing lessons.

In the following years she appeared in supporting roles in various TV series. In 2008, she was cast in Kurtlar Vadisi Pusu as Ebru Alemdar. In 2010, she got a role in the series Karadağlar alongside Erdal Özyağcılar, İbrahim Çelikkol, Korel Cezayirli, Burak Sağyaşar, Ahmet Rıfat Şungar and Güzin Özyağcılar. She portrayed the character of Gülhayat in this series.

The main breakthrough in her acting career came in 2012, with the leading role in the TV series Dila Hanım alongside Erkan Petekkaya, Mahir Günşiray, Necip Memili and Yonca Cevher. In 2014, she was cast opposite Özcan Deniz in the series Kaderimin Yazıldığı Gün, which received high ratings in Turkey. She also began acting in the drama series Uyanış Büyük Selçuklu, with the role of Terken Hatun in 2020.

She is married to producer and fellow actor Burak Sağyaşar in 2015. Their son, Can, was born in 2017.

Filmography

Film
 Hayat Öpücüğü - 2015 - Hayat

TV series
 İyilik - 2022–2023 - Neslihan Arkun
 Uyanış: Büyük Selçuklu - 2020–2021 - Terken Hatun
 Yüksek Sosyete - 2016 - Herself (guest appearance)
 Kaderimin Yazıldığı Gün - 2014 - Elif Yörükhan 
 Dila Hanım - 2012 - Dila Hanım
 Karadağlar - 2010 - Gülhayat
 Geniş Aile - 2010 - Şelale (guest appearance)
 Kurtlar Vadisi Pusu - 2008–2010 - Ebru Alemdar
 Yaban Gülü - 2008 - Laçin
 Fesupanallah - 2007 - Gülpare
 İki Yabancı - 2007- Zeyno
 Eylül - 2005 - Aziza
 Yeni Hayat - 2001 - Buket

References

External links 
 
 

Living people
1983 births
Actresses from Istanbul
21st-century Turkish actresses
Turkish television actresses
Turkish film actresses